This is a list of the 103 municipalities in the province of Málaga, in the autonomous community of Andalusia, Spain. The autonomous city of Melilla was formerly a municipality of the comarca of Málaga 14 March 1995, when the Statute of Autonomy of Melilla was passed.

+ two further municipalities, Montecorto and Serrato, were created in 2015 out of parts of Ronda municipality; the 2018 figure for Ronda reflects this change.
++ a new municipality, created in 2009 from part of Antequera municipality.

References

See also
Geography of Spain
List of cities in Spain

Malaga